The Women's 4 × 400 metres relay event at the 1999 World Championships in Athletics was held at the Estadio Olímpico de Sevilla on August 28 and August 29.

Medals

Results

Heats
All times shown are in minutes.

Heat 1
 (Natalya Sharova, Yekaterina Bakhvalova, Tatyana Chebykina, Svetlana Goncharenko) 3:24.51 Q (WL)
 (Tamsyn Lewis, Lee Naylor, Susan Andrews, Cathy Freeman) 3:27.31 Q
 (Julia Duporty, Zulia Calatayud, Yudalis Díaz, Idalmis Bonne) 3:27.54 q
 (Karlene Haughton, LaDonna Antoine-Watkins, Candice Jones, Foy Williams) 3:28.47 (SB)
 (Aïda Diop, Mame Tacko Diouf, Aminata Diouf, Amy Mbacké Thiam) 3:30.99 (NR)
 (Elena Córcoles, Yolanda Reyes, Miriam Bravo, Lisette Ferri) 3:36.28

Heat 2
 (Anke Feller, Uta Rohländer-Fromm, Anja Knippel, Anja Rücker) 3:24.80 Q (SB)
 (Jitka Burianová, Hana Benešová, Ludmila Formanová, Helena Fuchsová) 3:25.58 Q (SB)
 (Beverly Grant, Charmaine Howell, Tracey Barnes, Claudine Williams) 3:27.78 q (SB)
 (Donna Fraser, Helen Frost, Michelle Thomas, Sinead Dudgeon) 3:27.99 (SB)
 (Mireille Nguimgo, Myriam Léonie Mani, Stéphanie Nicole Zanga, Claudine Komgang) 3:33.51 (NR)
 (Jocelyn Harris, Grace Dinkins, Joetta Dweh, Hannah Cooper) 3:55.30 (NR)

Heat 3
 (Suziann Reid, Maicel Malone-Wallace, Andrea Anderson, Michelle Collins) 3:25.10 Q (SB)
 (Danielle Perpoli, Patrizia Spuri, Monika Niederstätter, Virna De Angeli) 3:31.67 Q
 (Andrea Blackett, Melissa Straker, Lucy-Ann Richards, Joanne Durant) 3:34.37
 (M. K. Asha, K. Mathews Beenamol, Rosa Kutty, Jincy Phillip) 3:36.54
 (Falilat Ogunkoya, Charity Opara, Olabisi Afolabi, Mabel Madojemu) DNS
 (Otilia Ruicu-Esanu, Ionela Târlea, Andrea Burlacu, Ana Maria Barbu) DNS

Final
 (Tatyana Chebykina, Svetlana Goncharenko, Olga Kotlyarova, Natalya Nazarova) 3:21.98 (WL)
 (Suziann Reid, Maicel Malone-Wallace, Michelle Collins, Jearl Miles Clark) 3:22.09 (SB)
 (Anke Feller, Uta Rohländer-Fromm, Anja Rücker, Grit Breuer) 3:22.43 (SB)
 (Jitka Burianová, Hana Benešová, Ludmila Formanová, Helena Fuchsová) 3:23.82 (SB)
 (Beverly Grant, Lorraine Fenton, Claudine Williams, Deon Hemmings) 3:24.83 (SB)
 (Tania Van Heer, Lee Naylor, Susan Andrews, Cathy Freeman)  3:28.04
 (Julia Duporty, Zulia Calatayud, Yudalis Díaz, Idalmis Bonne) 3:29.19
 (Virna De Angeli, Patrizia Spuri, Francesca Carbone, Monika Niederstätter) 3:29.56

References
 trackandfieldnews

4 x 400 metres relay women
Relays at the World Athletics Championships
1999 in women's athletics